Nicky John Savoie (born on September 21, 1973) is a former professional American football tight end who played during one season in the National Football League (NFL) with the New Orleans Saints.

Savoie was born in Cut Off, Louisiana, and attended South Lafourche High School. He attended Louisiana State University, where he played college football for the LSU Tigers football team. He was selected by the Saints in the sixth round of the 1997 NFL Draft. During the 1997 NFL season, Savoie appeared in one game with the Saints, making one reception for 14 yards. Savoie later played for the New Orleans Thunder of the short-lived Regional Football League in 1999 and the Houston Marshals of the Spring Football League in 2000.

References

1973 births
Living people
People from Cut Off, Louisiana
Players of American football from Louisiana
American football tight ends
LSU Tigers football players
New Orleans Saints players
Regional Football League players